Ferdinand "Fritz" Frithum was an Austrian international footballer and coach.

References

Year of birth missing
Year of death missing
Association football forwards
Austrian footballers
Austria international footballers
First Vienna FC players
Austrian football managers
First Vienna FC managers
FC Metz managers